Qeshlaq-e Ayiri Darreh Hajj Mahbat (also Romanized as Qeshlāq-e Āyīrī Darreh Ḩājj Maḥbat) is a village in Qeshlaq-e Gharbi Rural District, Aslan Duz District, Parsabad County, Ardabil Province, Iran. At the 2006 census, its population was 84, in 18 families.

References 

Towns and villages in Parsabad County